Tooraj Haghverdi (born  January 7, 1993) is an Iranian football referee.

References

Iranian football referees
Living people
People from Tehran
1973 births